Ronald "Ron" Hermannes Boudrie (born April 6, 1960) is a retired volleyball player from the Netherlands, who represented his native country at two consecutive Summer Olympics starting in 1988. He ended up in fifth place at the 1988 Summer Olympics and received a silver medal four years later in Barcelona.

References
  Dutch Olympic Committee

1960 births
Living people
Dutch men's volleyball players
Olympic silver medalists for the Netherlands
Olympic volleyball players of the Netherlands
Sportspeople from The Hague
Volleyball players at the 1988 Summer Olympics
Volleyball players at the 1992 Summer Olympics
Olympic medalists in volleyball

Medalists at the 1992 Summer Olympics